Samanabedda cave temple (Sinhalaː සමනබැද්ද පුරාණ ගල්ලෙන් විහාරය) is an ancient Buddhist temple situated in Uhana, Ampara District, Sri Lanka. The temple has been formally recognised by the Government as an archaeological site in Sri Lanka. It is believed that the temple was built by king Saddha Tissa (137–119 BC).

Gallery

References

Buddhist temples in Ampara District
Buddhist caves in Sri Lanka
Archaeological protected monuments in Ampara District